This is a list of commercial banks in Morocco

Major banks

* In Million DH

Other banks
 CFG Bank
Arab Bank Maroc
 Banco Immobiliario & Mercantil de Marruecos
 Bank Al Amal
 Bex-Maroc
 Caisse Interprofessionnelle Marocaine de Retraites
 Caisse Marocaine des Marches
 Caisse Mutualiste Interprofessionelle
 Caisserie Commerciale
 Citibank Maghreb
 Limar Bank Casa Union Marocaine de Banques
 Raw-Mat Bank
 Societe de Banque & de Credit
 Societe Mithaq Al Maghreb
 Union Bancaria Hispano Marroqui Uniban
 Union Marocaine de Banques

Defunct banks 
 Banque Commerciale du Maroc
 Banque Marocaine pour l'Afrique et l'Orient
 Banque Nationale pour le Developpement Economique
 Societe Marocaine de Depot et Credit
 Wafabank

Resources
 Currency Exchange Practices at Moroccan Banks

See also
 List of banks in the Arab world

References

 http://www.portalino.it/banks/_ma.htm

 
Banks
Morocco
Morocco